Hemidactylus nicolauensis is a species of house gecko. It is endemic to the Cape Verde Islands.

Etymology
The specific name nicolauensis refers to São Nicolau, the island in which the species was found.

References

Further reading
 

Hemidactylus
Endemic vertebrates of Cape Verde
Reptiles described in 2020
Taxa named by Gunther Köhler